Maninder Singh  (born 13 June 1965) is a former Indian cricket player and a cricket commentator. Singh has represented India in 35 Test matches and 59 One Day Internationals. With his slow left-arm orthodox spin, Maninder was considered as an heir to Bishan Singh Bedi, who then held the record as India's leading spinner in terms of wickets. Maninder Singh retired prematurely due to personal reasons. Singh holds the Test record for the most Tests in a complete career without aggregating 100 runs.

Career
Maninder Singh began his career playing against Pakistan at Karachi, in December 1982. His last match was against Zimbabwe in May 1993. He was regarded as an heir apparent of the legendary Bishan Singh Bedi, and at the height of his career, he was reputed to possess a huge variety in his arsenal. He is often credited to have bowled an over, in which each of the six balls would be different from the previous one juggling with flight, length and spin. His international career was however cut short due to lot of internal team politics. He took 88 wickets in his 35 Tests, with a best of seven wickets for 27 runs. He took 66 wickets in One Day Internationals and a best of four wickets for 22 runs.

He is now mostly remembered for his dismissal in the Madras test resulting in a tie against Australia in 1986–87 series.

Though now retired from active cricket, Maninder is still in the scene as a cricket expert.

Controversy
On 22 May 2007, Maninder was questioned by police for possession of cocaine and he confessed to using cocaine for himself. It is alleged that they found 1.5 grams of cocaine in his residence in East Delhi, sold to him by a Nigerian national the police had been following. Maninder though denied the charges vehemently. In 2012, he was acquitted of the charge.

In the early hours of 8 June 2007 Maninder was admitted to Shanti Mukund hospital in Delhi with injuries to his wrists. His wife has issued a statement saying that it was "purely an accident" however local TV channels have speculated that it could be the result of a fake suicide attempt or even a domestic accident.

References

1965 births
Living people
Cricketers from Pune
India One Day International cricketers
India Test cricketers
Cricketers at the 1987 Cricket World Cup
Delhi cricketers
North Zone cricketers
Shropshire cricketers
Indian cricket commentators
Indian Sikhs
M Parkinson's World XI cricketers